Sarah Nauta (born 18 June 1998) is a Dutch actress, singer, and dancer.

Life and career 
Nauta was born in Amsterdam. She’s a musician and sings with her younger sister Julia Nauta, as well as plays the guitar and ukulele. She played Jane in Mary Poppins in the Dutch theater. In 2013, she was a member on the Junior Eurosongfestival 2013 as a duo with Julia. She also lent her voice in television series like Winx Club and Zoey 101. She also played Loes in SpangaS.

Filmography

Film

Television

Other Roles
 Winx Club – Macy and Lemmy (voice, Dutch dub)
 Zoey 101 – Rebecca and Dana (voice, Dutch dub)

References

General references 
 Biography 
 Biography 
 Resume 
 Resume

External links 
 

1998 births
21st-century Dutch singers
Dutch voice actresses
Living people
21st-century Dutch women singers